Calfee Nunatak is an isolated nunatak at the east side of Reeves Neve,  west of Mount Fenton, in Victoria Land. It was mapped by the United States Geological Survey from surveys and from U.S. Navy aerial photographs, 1956–62, and named by the Advisory Committee on Antarctic Names for David W. Calfee, field assistant at McMurdo Station, 1965–66.

References 

Nunataks of Victoria Land
Borchgrevink Coast